Paño verde (Green Cloth) is a 1973 Argentine gangster film drama directed by Mario David. The film, based on a 1955 novel of the same name by Roger Plá, is set in Buenos Aires in the 1940s, covering the formation, rise and fall of a criminal gang. It stars Carlos Estrada as the protagonist mafia boss Miguel Acuña, Luis Brandoni, Julia von Grolman and Héctor Alterio. Víctor Proncet composed the soundtrack.

Plot
In 1940s Buenos Aires, the laconic, immaculately dressed Miguel Acuña, or "El Púa" (Carlos Estrada) leads a double life. He owns a bar and appears apathetic to the customers but is secretly a violent criminal. He murders the local mafia boss after threatening him with a knife and shoots him dead when he reacts with a gun. He throws the knife in the river. Miguel becomes the leader.

The gang pull off a series of robberies. At one robbery by the docks they shoot several people dead, including several of the guards and a man in a car, which they use as the getaway vehicle after the tires are shot at on their own vehicle. In the next robbery, Miguel accidentally shoots a young boy dead while shooting at the guards. His guilt is only revealed when he overhears customers at the bar talking about his death, forcing him to walk out in awkward silence.

While planning a bigger caper, Alma (Julia von Grolman), the wife of his associate Américo (Luis Brandoni), falls in love with Miguel. Miguel reluctantly relents to her advances but proceeds to beat her, despite professing his love for her. Tano, one of the gang members, is reluctant to participate in the imminent big bank robbery and is threatened by Miguel. During the robbery, when Tano' s  worries come to fruition and he is shot by one of the guards, rather than save him, Miguel shoots him dead while making their escape. The getaway vehicle catches fire but the men escape.

The police invade Américo and Alma's flat while Américo is in the bathroom shaving. Américo pretends to surrender but turns on an officer, holding his razor blade to his throat, but is shot dead in front of his wife as backup officers arrive. The police arrive at the bar and surround Miguel. Miguel manages to escape, but only by ruthlessly shooting dead a female admirer and an old friend, to buy him time to escape. He is eventually shot on the roof and falls to his death through the skylight onto the bar's pool table, much to the shock of the bartender who had never suspected his wicked ways.

Cast

  Carlos Estrada as Miguel Acuña, "El Púa"
  Luis Brandoni as Américo
  Julia von Grolman as Alma
  Héctor Alterio as El "Tano" Folco
  Edgardo Suárez as Galíndez
  Luisina Brando as Chola
  José María Gutiérrez as Ambrosio
  Juan Carlos de Seta
  Alicia Bruzzo as Pola
  María José Demare as Prostitute
  Raúl del Valle
  Aldo Mayo as Policeman
  Olga Berg as Woman at dance
  Mario Savino as boy in bar
  Ricardo Grecco
  Osvaldo María Cabrera
  Tito Barceló as singer
  María Estela Lorca as woman in assault
  Marta Serra
  Carlos Veltri
  Mara Lascio
  Amadeo Sáenz Valiente
  Pachi Armas
  Mario Luciani
  Félix Caballero
  Domingo Cutri
  Lucho Fabri
  Juan Carlos Villegas
  Andrés Midón
  Roberto Fiore
  Clemente Bermúdez
  Denis Romano
  Juan Carlos Ricci
  Alejandro Villordo Paz
  Raimondo Diego
  Domingo Barbieri
  Tito Báez
  Arsenio Reinaldo Pica
  José María Brindisi
  Lidia Lugo

Production
The screenplay was written by the director Mario David, based on the 1955 novel of the same name by Roger Plá. Cinematographer Arsenio Reinaldo Pica was hired to shoot the film, working with cameraman Roberto Matarrese. Víctor Proncet composed the soundtrack, while the editing was done by Oscar Pariso.

Reception
The film premiered on 1 March 1973 in Buenos Aires. It was well received by the critics, with Edmundo Etchelbaum of La Opinión declaring it to be a "Revelation of a good commercial film director" and La Razón stating that the film has "good technical quality and a group of excellent actors". Clarín though was more favorable to the cinematography, opining that the "camera extracts much more and is so much better than some of the passages of dialogue", which they believed cooled the effectiveness of certain scenes. In his book Breve historia del cine argentino, César Maranghello  states that he believes Paño verde to have been David's best picture, praising the "fury and nostalgia of its protagonist", Carlos Estrada.

See also
List of Argentine films of 1973

References

External links
 

1973 films
1970s Spanish-language films
1973 drama films
Films directed by Mario David
1970s gang films
Films set in the 1940s
Argentine crime drama films
1973 crime drama films